Cucumericrus decoratus is a species of putative radiodont known from a few poorly preserved specimens. Only fragments of trunk cuticle and corresponded appendages had been revealed, while important radiodont features such as frontal appendages are unknown in this species. The trunk cuticle possess irregular wrinkles and may had been soft in life. Each of the trunk appendage compose of a dorsal flap-like element and a ventral stubby leg with unknown distal region, structurally comparable to the trunk appendages of gill lobopodians (dorsal flaps and ventral lobopods) and euarthropod biramous appendages (flap-like exopod and limb-like endopod). The legs have been interpreted as somewhere between annulated lobopod legs and segmented arthropod legs.

References

Anomalocaridids
Fossil taxa described in 1995
Prehistoric protostome genera
Cambrian genus extinctions

Maotianshan shales fossils